Mahmoud Shaaban is an Egyptian footballer who plays for the Egyptian Premier League side Future FC as a defender.

Biography 
Mahmoud Shaaban was born on March 7 1995 in Egypt.He started his football career Al-Ittihad in 2015. In 2019  he was transferred to FC Masr and in the same year, he was returned to Al Ittihad. In 2021 he was bought by Ghazl El Mahalla and he is currently in Future FC.

References 

Egyptian Premier League players
Future FC (Egypt) players